Miasino is a comune (municipality) in the Province of Novara in the Italian region of Piedmont, located about  northeast of Turin and about  northwest of Novara.

The municipality of Miasino contains the frazioni (subdivisions, mainly villages and hamlets) Pisogno, Tortirogno and Carcegna.

Miasino borders the following municipalities: Ameno, Armeno, Orta San Giulio, and Pettenasco.

Curiosity
In the Castle of Miasino was filmed the thriller movie A Thorn in the Heart (original title Una spina nel cuore) (1986) by Alberto Lattuada. (Info by the Dizionario del Turismo Cinematografico)

Demographic evolution

References

External links
 www.comune.miasino.novara.it/